Abu Sadreyn (also Romanized as Abū Şadreyn; also known as Farāzān and Rūstā-ye Abū Şadreyn) is a village in Nasar Rural District, Arvandkenar District, Abadan County, Khuzestan Province, Iran. At the 2006 census, its population was 215, in 48 families.

References 

Populated places in Abadan County